Reorient was a Canadian online magazine focusing on contemporary Middle Eastern arts and culture. The magazine was founded in 2012 by Joobin Bekhrad who also edited the magazine. The areas covered primarily included visual art, music, books and literature, and film. The magazine folded in January 2018.

Profile
Reorient has been mentioned and cited in a number of publications and websites from around the world, including Newsweek, Campaign Magazine, Art Dubai, Canvas, Harper’s Bazaar Art Arabia, Oasis, Art & Antiques, the Cairo Review of Global Affairs, and Ryerson Folio.

References

External links
 

2012 establishments in Ontario
2018 disestablishments in Ontario
Defunct magazines published in Canada
Magazines established in 2012
Magazines disestablished in 2018
Magazines published in Toronto
Online magazines published in Canada
Visual arts magazines published in Canada
Multicultural and ethnic magazines in Canada